The Marama, also known as Abamarama, are a Luhya tribe occupying Marama Location in Kakamega District of the western province of Kenya. The town of Butere is located in west Marama and is a significant trading centre in Kakamega. They are said to have assimilated the Abashikunga sub tribe.

History and culture

They are a calm people, welcoming and quite organized. Main activities include crop farming and small scale business. The current member of parliament (2018) for the area is Tindi Mwale, a Marama. The first Governor of Kakamega, His Excellency Opararanya, also hails from the community.

Migrations
Marama people are said to have come to Kenya through Uganda. After the collapse of the Chwezi Empire of Uganda, a man named Wamoyi migrated to Tiriki with his three sons (Wanga, Khabiakala and Eshifumbi). Wanga migrated to Emanga, Eshifumbi migrated to Emahondo (he is the ancestor of the Abamuyira and Abakakoya clans). Angulu (Wanga's nephew) migrated to Butere. His offspring founded the Abakhuli, Abashiambitsi, Abakhongo and Abaseta. Martin Shikuku was from Abarecheya. With over 40% of the population, Abamukhula is the dominant clan with several subclans and they are the “real” Abamarama. Other big clans are the Abashirotsa, Abatere, Abashieni, Abamanyulia, Abalukhoba.

See also
 Luhya languages

Sources
 Gideon S. Ware; Western Kenya Historical Texts: Abaluyia, Teso and Elgon Kalenjin, Nairobi: East African Literature Bureau, 1967, 196p.

References

Luhya
Kenyan Luhya people